Herbert Baddeley and Wilfred Baddeley defeated Harry Barlow and Ernest Renshaw 4–6, 6–4, 7–5, 0–6, 6–2 in the All Comers' Final, and then defeated the reigning champions Joshua Pim and Frank Stoker 6–1, 6–3, 1–6, 6–2 in the challenge round to win the gentlemen's doubles tennis title at the 1891 Wimbledon Championships.

Draw

Challenge round

All Comers'

References

External links

Gentlemen's Doubles
Wimbledon Championship by year – Men's doubles